HiTech is a chess machine built at Carnegie Mellon University under the direction of World Correspondence Chess Champion Dr. Hans J. Berliner, by Berliner, Carl Ebeling, Murray Campbell, and Gordon Goetsch.

HiTech was the first computer chess system to reach the 2400 (senior master) USCF rating level. It won the Pennsylvania State Chess Championship twice.

HiTech won the 1985 and 1989 editions of the North American Computer Chess Championship. In 1988 HiTech defeated GM Arnold Denker 3½-½ in a match (though Denker was at the time well past his best, with an Elo rating of 2300).

HiTech was one of two competing chess projects at Carnegie Mellon; the one that would succeed in the quest of beating the World Chess Champion was its rival ChipTest (the predecessor of IBM's Deep Thought and Deep Blue).

References 

Chess computers
One-of-a-kind computers